The Township of Wilmot is a rural township in the Regional Municipality of Waterloo in southwestern Ontario, Canada.

History

Archaic and Woodland periods

The earliest concrete evidence of human activity within Wilmot dates to around 8,300 years ago, in the Early Archaic period, though some artifacts are thought to be as old as 13,000 years. Early Archaic evidence is in the form of artifacts from the Hunsberger Creek site (AiHd-83). This site on the upper part of Hunsberger Creek saw occupation during the Early and Middle Archaic periods, as well as the Middle and possibly Late Woodland periods. In one interpretation of the site, it represents a place of significant repeated short-term occupation; namely, a "headwater camp" where mobile hunter-gatherers stopped near the uppermost part of a waterway before possibly returning down the waterway or migrating to another drainage system.

Archaeological investigation in Wilmot in the 1980s uncovered the largest known historic remains of a longhouse in North America. Along with three smaller longhouses, it formed the core of a village which may have had up to 600 inhabitants at its peak. Dated to between 1400 and 1450 CE (falling within the Late Woodland period), it is associated with the Neutral people, an Iroquoian society.

Arrival of Europeans
Wilmot Township was a Crown Reserve by 1791. After a survey in 1824, Mennonites from Waterloo Township and Amish from Europe began to settle here. The first settlement area was prepared by Christian Nafziger, an Amish Mennonite from Pennsylvania, but originally from Germany. After 1828, Roman Catholics and Lutherans from Alsace and Germany, Anglicans from Britain and others arrived and began to develop the area and construct buildings and roads. Most settlers were farmers. Much of the area was settled by those of German heritage, but also included some of Scottish, English, and Irish origins; the latter groups owned land primarily in the southern third of the township.

Likely to have been the first settler in what has been called Hamburgh or New Hamburg since about 1840, millwright Josiah Cushman arrived from Germany in the early 1830s. He dammed Smith's Creek and built a sawmill that helped attract others. William Scott, (Lord Campfield in Scotland), now considered to be the founder of New Hamburg, arrived in 1838, after Cushman's death. He renamed Smith's Creek the Nith River, built a new dam and constructed a new lumber sawmill. The mill continued to plane lumber until 1902 when it burned down. The replacement building was a feed mill, later known as B-W Feed and Seed; that entity still exists, now as a sales outlet for feed.

Arriving in Wilmot in 1838, were John Meyer, Peter Wilker, Jacob Stoebler, Deobold Segler, and John Marteyne. In 1840, the township became part of the District of Wellington and received the right to elect officials and to tax land owners. The first Township council was elected in January 1850.

At the 1841 population count there were 2,200 people in the township, most of whom were self-described as "Germans". The post office opened in 1844.

Records from 1846 indicate that the township consisted of 51,463 acres of which 15,310 were being cultivated. Existing villages included Hamburg and Haysville, and there were two grist mills and nine sawmills on the Nith River (previously called Smith's Creek).

By 1864, the township included a Lutheran church, a tannery, one store, two hotels, two wagon makers, shoe and boot makers, as well as carpenters and mechanics. The school had about 60 students. The settlement was receiving mail daily. There were also two Roman Catholic Separate Schools in the township of Wilmot in 1864.

Some of the original settlements have Heritage signs indicating their location in the 1800s: Holland Mills, Josephsburg, New Prussia, Pinehill, Punkeydoodle's Corner, Rosebank, Victoriaburg, and Waldau.

Communities
The township comprises the communities of Baden, Berlett's Corners, Haysville, Josephburg, Luxemburg, Mannheim, New Dundee, New Hamburg, New Prussia, Petersburg, Phillipsburg, St. Agatha, Schindelsteddle and Wilmot Centre, as well as most of Punkeydoodles Corners, a crossroads which straddles the municipal boundaries of Wilmot, East Zorra – Tavistock and Perth East.

St. Agatha was initially called Wilmot and then it was renamed probably after the local Catholic church that had been built in the 1830s. 
Most early settlers to this area were German: Amish Mennonites, Lutherans, and Roman Catholics. The latter were the majority, making St. Agatha the centre of Catholic community in the Township. By 1834, there were two public log schools and a Catholic log school. More modern school buildings were erected about 20 years later. The Amish Mennonites built their meeting house in 1885.

Some of the settlers moved on to other areas so the community remained small. In 1869, the population was only and by 1890 it had dropped to 200. By 1906, there was a hotel, a blacksmith shop, some stores and various tradesmen.

Demographics 

The single largest self-reported ethnicity was German;  also reported knowledge of the German language and  reported it as a mother tongue.

Transportation

The railway passes through the cores of both Baden and New Hamburg, while the highway bypasses the town centres to the south.

Passenger trains on Via Rail's Québec City–Windsor Corridor pass through Wilmot daily, but run as expresses through the township and do not stop. GO Train service on the Kitchener line is also available at Kitchener station, which is its western terminus. A GO train station and storage and maintenance yard were planned to be located near Baden, but these plans were deferred following the opening of a GO train depot on Shirley Avenue in Kitchener instead.

, Wilmot is served by a single bus route, Grand River Transit's Route 77 Wilmot. It operates on a 12-hour weekday schedule and uses "flex stops" to provide more convenient service to riders in certain areas. The route connects New Hamburg, Baden, and Petersburg to the Boardwalk bus terminal on the west end of Kitchener-Waterloo. After an initial pilot in 2016–17 which was funded by a provincial community transportation grant, the route was made a permanent part of the Grand River Transit system.

Athletics
Wilmot Aquatic Aces Swim Club
New Hamburg Firebirds (Hockey)
New Hamburg Huskies (Hockey)
Wilmot Warthogs (Rugby)

See also

 List of townships in Ontario
 List of municipalities in Ontario

References

Further reading

External links

Amish in Canada
 
Township municipalities in Ontario
Lower-tier municipalities in Ontario
Municipalities in the Regional Municipality of Waterloo